Mercury 6 or variants may refer to:

Mercury 6, a spacecraft of Project Mercury
Mercury VI, several versions of the Bristol Mercury aircraft engine

See also
Mercury-Atlas 6, the first American orbital spaceflight, 1962